The Diary of Anne Frank is a 1980 American made-for-television biographical drama film which originally aired on NBC on November 17, 1980. Like the 1959 film of the same name, it was written by Frances Goodrich and Albert Hackett and directed by Boris Sagal. Unlike the 1959 film, the TV-film focuses more on character development than suspense, and is considerably shorter than the 1959 version.

Melissa Gilbert plays Anne Frank. Scott Jacoby, the actor portraying Peter Van Daan in the film, is the real-life grandson of Lou Jacobi, who portrayed Peter's father, Hans Van Dann, in the 1959 film.

The film received mixed reviews.

Cast 

 Maximilian Schell as Otto Frank
 Joan Plowright as Edith Frank
 James Coco as Hans Van Daan
 Doris Roberts as Petronella Van Daan
 Clive Revill as Dr. Dussel
 Scott Jacoby as Peter Van Daan
 Melissa Gilbert as Anne Frank
 Melora Marshall as Margot Frank
 Erik Holland as Mr. Kraler
 Anne Wyndham as Miep Gies

Awards
The film was nominated for one Golden Globe award in 1981, for Best Mini-Series or Motion Picture Made for TV. It was nominated for three Emmy awards, also in 1981, for Outstanding Achievement in Makeup (Scott H. Eddo and Stanley Smith), Outstanding Cinematography for a Limited Series or a Special (Ted Voigtlander) and Outstanding Individual Achievement - Special Class (Rita Bennett, women's costumer, and Bill Blackburn, men's costumer).

External links

1980 television films
1980 films
1980s biographical drama films
American biographical drama films
Films about Anne Frank
Holocaust films
Films directed by Boris Sagal
NBC network original films
20th Century Fox Television films
Films scored by Billy Goldenberg
1980s American films